is a Japanese football player. He plays for Gamba Osaka and the Japan national team. He is a goalkeeper.

Club career

Born and raised in Osaka, Tani came through the youth ranks at Gamba Osaka and was promoted to the first team ahead of the 2018 season. He made his top team debut in a J.League Cup match away to Sanfrecce Hiroshima on 9 May 2018.   Gamba recovered from a 2-0 half-time deficit to run out 3-2 winners.

Prior to joining Gamba's J1 team, Tani played 4 times for Gamba Under-23 in J3 League in 2017.   Following his elevation to the club's first-team squad, he earned more playing time at J3 level appearing 17 times as part of a rotation system with Ryota Suzuki.

National Team Career

He appeared for Japan as a goalkeeper in the 2017 FIFA U-17 World Cup and played a total of 7 games at that level.

Career statistics

Last update: 24 November 2022

Reserves performance

Last Updated: 2 December 2018

References

External links

2000 births
Living people
Association football goalkeepers
Association football people from Osaka Prefecture
Japanese footballers
Japan youth international footballers
J1 League players
J3 League players
Gamba Osaka players
Gamba Osaka U-23 players
Shonan Bellmare players
Footballers at the 2020 Summer Olympics
Olympic footballers of Japan